Homo Faber may refer to:
 Homo faber, a philosophical concept articulated by Hannah Arendt and Max Scheler
 Homo Faber (novel), a novel by Max Frisch